Manal Awad Mikhail is the current governor of Damietta, Egypt. She was sworn in by President Abdel Fattah Al-Sisi. She is the first female Coptic Christian governor and second female governor in Egypt. Before this appointment, Mikhail was the deputy governor of Giza.

Education 
Mikhail is a graduate of Veterinary Science from the University of Benha. She has a master's degree and a PhD in Natural Sciences from the University of Alexandria in 1999.

References 

Year of birth missing (living people)
Living people
Egyptian Copts
21st-century Egyptian women politicians
21st-century Egyptian politicians
Governors of Damietta
Egyptian veterinarians